Since its founding in 1990, elections within the Social Democratic Party of Croatia were held numerous times.

2007 leadership election

The Social Democratic Party of Croatia 2007 leadership election following the death of longtime leader Ivica Račan was held on 2 June 2007. Deputy leader Željka Antunović served as the acting leader and ran for a full term. Little known party spokesperson Zoran Milanović ran as an outsider and reformist promising much needed modernization of the party. Other candidates included Zagreb mayor Milan Bandić and former Foreign Affairs Minister Tonino Picula. Milanović pulled out an unexpected win in the first ballot, but failed to achieve an outright majority. He defeated Antunović in the second ballot and became the leader of the party.

Results

2008 leadership election

The Social Democratic Party of Croatia 2008 leadership election to elect the leader of the party was held on 11 May 2008. The incumbent leader Zoran Milanović had first been elected only a year earlier, but lost a close race in the 2007 general election. Davorko Vidović and Dragan Kovačević hoped to unseat the incumbent. Milanović was easily reelected in the first ballot with almost 80 percent of the delegate vote.

Results

2012 leadership election

The Social Democratic Party of Croatia 2012 leadership election to elect the leader of the party was held on 12 May 2012. The incumbent leader and Prime Minister Zoran Milanović ran for his third term since first being elected in 2007 and was unopposed following the party's landslide victory in the 2011 general election. A total of 38,887 party members were eligible to vote of which an estimated 61% turned out. Zoran Milanović was easily reelected receiving 23,554 votes. 179 votes were invalid. This was the first leadership election in any party in Croatia that was held with all party members being eligible to vote.

April 2016 leadership election

The Social Democratic Party of Croatia 2016 leadership election to elect the leader of the party were held on 2 April 2016. All party members were eligible to vote. Zoran Milanović remained the President of the SDP with 62% of the vote.

Zoran Milanović the incumbent leader and former Prime Minister  ran for his fourth term since first being elected in 2007 and was opposed by Zlatko Komadina the prefect of Primorje-Gorski Kotar County.

According to the Statute of the SDP, the candidates had to collect 1,000 signatures of support of members of the party for the candidacy to be valid. Komadina collected about 5,200 signatures and  Milanović collected about 11,000 signatures. The third candidate Dusko Polovina failed to collect the required 1,000 signatures of support.

Result 

Source

November 2016 leadership election

Results

2020 leadership election
After bad result on 2020 Parliamentary elections and resignation of party leader Davor Bernardić, Social Democratic Party held new leadership election on 26 September 2020. Five candidates were running for the position of party leader, 17 candidates for members of presidency and 103 candidates for main board. Second round was held on 3 October 2020 between Peđa Grbin and Željko Kolar, with Grbin winning and becoming new leader of the party and leader of opposition.

References

Elections in Croatia
Political party leadership elections
Social Democratic Party of Croatia